Gary Miller (born 15 April 1987) is a Scottish footballer who plays as a defensive midfielder or defender, currently playing for East Kilbride. He has previously played for Livingston, Ross County, St Johnstone, Partick Thistle, Plymouth Argyle and Carlisle United, as well as Ayr United on loan.

Career

Livingston
Miller began his career at Livingston, making his debut a substitute on 29 October 2005, in a 1–1 draw away to Falkirk. He made 40 league appearances for Livingston during his six-year spell at the club.

On 31 August 2006, Miller moved on loan to Ayr United, where he scored his first career goal on his debut away to Forfar Athletic. He then spent the 2007–08 season on loan at Ross County, helping the club win the Second Division title.

Ross County
On 2 June 2009, Miller returned to Ross County, this time on a permanent basis. In his first season, the club reached the Scottish Cup Final, where Miller played the full ninety minutes, however it ended in defeat as Ross County lost 3–0 to Dundee United at Hampden.

In Miller's second season at Ross County, the club won the 2010–11 Scottish Challenge Cup, with a 2–0 victory against Queen of the South at McDiarmid Park. The following season, he helped Ross County win the 2011–12 Scottish First Division and promotion to the Scottish Premier League.

St Johnstone
In May 2012, Miller signed for St Johnstone, spending three years at the club where he was part of the side that competed in successive Europa League qualifiers. In the 2013–14 season, he made it to another Scottish Cup Final, where he was an unused substitute, however this time he collected a winners medal as St Johnstone beat Dundee United 2–0.

Partick Thistle
Miller signed a one-year contract with Scottish Premiership team Partick Thistle on 20 July 2015, after spending the summer on trial with the club. He scored his first goal for the club, a 25-yard volley against his former team St Johnstone in a 2–1 win for Thistle, on 17 October 2015. Miller rejected a new contract offer with Partick Thistle in June 2016 and subsequently left the club.

Plymouth Argyle
Miller signed for Football League Two club Plymouth Argyle on 23 June 2016, where he joined up with manager Derek Adams who had been his teammate at Livingston and Ross County and then his manager at Ross County.

Carlisle United
Miller signed for Football League Two club Carlisle United on 19 June 2018. At the end of the season, he was released by the club.

Falkirk
On 12 August 2019, Miller signed for Scottish League One club Falkirk on a contract until January 2020.

East Kilbride
Miller signed for East Kilbride in 2022.

Career statistics

Honours
Ross County
Scottish Second Division: 2007–08
Scottish Challenge Cup: 2010–11
Scottish First Division: 2011–12

St Johnstone
Scottish Cup: 2013–14

References

External links

 (2007–08 appearances)

1987 births
Living people
Scottish footballers
Scottish Premier League players
Scottish Football League players
Scottish Professional Football League players
English Football League players
Livingston F.C. players
Ayr United F.C. players
Ross County F.C. players
Footballers from Glasgow
Association football defenders
St Johnstone F.C. players
Partick Thistle F.C. players
Plymouth Argyle F.C. players
Carlisle United F.C. players
Falkirk F.C. players
East Kilbride F.C. players